Twelve for Summer is a Canadian variety television series which aired on CBC Television from 1966 to 1967. Half-hour episodes originated from various Canadian cities.

Scheduling

Season 1 - 1966 

The first season aired Saturdays 7 p.m. from 25 June to 3 September 1966.

Season 2 - 1967 
The second season aired on Sundays 7 p.m. from 18 June to 3 September 1967.

References

External links
 

CBC Television original programming
1966 Canadian television series debuts
1967 Canadian television series endings
1960s Canadian variety television series